Gordon Bell (born 1934) is an American electrical engineer, designer of the DEC PDP computer, namegiver and funder of the ACM Gordon Bell Prize.

Gordon Bell may also refer to:

Charles Gordon Bell (1889–1918), British pilot
Gordon Bell (surgeon) (1887–1970), New Zealand surgeon and university professor
Gordon Bell (actor) (1910–1998), British stage, screen and TV actor in The Man Who Never Was
Gordon Bell (physician) (1911–2005), Canadian physician
Gordie Bell (1925–1985), Canadian ice hockey goaltender
Gordon Bell (cartoonist) (1934–2014), British cartoon artist
Gordon Bell (American football) (born 1953), American football running back
Gordon Bell (footballer) (1906–1979), English footballer
Gordon Bell (singer-songwriter) (born 1969), Scottish musician based in Switzerland
Gordon Bell (QNX), Canadian software designer, co-founder of the QNX operating system

See also
Gordon Bell High School, Winnipeg, Canada
Gordon Bell Pianos
ACM Gordon Bell Prize, "Nobel Prize" of Supercomputing